Pierre Victor, baron de Besenval de Brünstatt (born Peter Joseph Viktor Besenval von Brunnstatt; 14 October 1721 – 2 June 1791) was Swiss military officer in French service.

Biography

His father was a colonel of the regiment of Swiss Guards in the pay of France. Through his mother, Besenval was the grandson of Polish politician Kazimierz Ludwik Bieliński. 

In 1731, Besenval joined the Swiss Guards as cadet.  He was promoted to ensign in 1733 and became the commander of the regiment's Besenval company in 1738. In the French army, he was promoted to brigadier in 1747, maréchal de camp in 1758, and lieutenant-general in 1762, the same year he was appointed inspector-general of the Swiss troops in French service. Besenval served at first as aide-de-camp to Victor François de Broglie during the campaign of 1748 in Bohemia, then as aide-de-camp to the Duke of Orléans during the Seven Years' War.

In the early 1760s, Besenval played a key role in the Duke of Choiseul's reform of the army. After being appointed military governor of Haguenau, he was made lieutenant-colonel of the Swiss Guards in 1767. After the accession of King Louis XVI, Besenval became a favorite of Queen Marie  Antoinette.

French Revolution

When the French Revolution broke out, Besenval remained firmly attached to the royal court and was given command of the troops which the king had concentrated in Paris in July 1789, a move which led to the Storming of the Bastille on 14 July 1789. Besenval showed incompetence in the crisis, and attempted to flee to his home country in late July. He was arrested and tried by the tribunal of the Châtelet in November 1789, on charges of high treason, but was acquitted on 1 March 1791. He died in Paris 2 June 1791.

Works

Besenval authored moral-philosophical essays, novels and poetic epistles. He is principally known as the author of his Mémoires, which were published in 1805 to 1807 by the vicomte de Ségur, who was said to be his actual son, in which are reported many scandalous tales, true or false, of the court of Louis XVI and Marie Antoinette. The authenticity of these memoirs is not absolutely established.

References

 

1722 births
1794 deaths
People from Solothurn
Swiss mercenaries
Swiss people of Polish descent
French military personnel of the Seven Years' War
18th-century Swiss military personnel